Olivier Djappa (born 22 November 1969) is a Cameroonian former footballer who played as a striker.

He played 80 matches and scored 28 goals in the 2. Bundesliga.

Honours
Individual
Regionalliga Süd top scorer: 1999–2000
 2. Bundesliga top scorer: 2000–01 (18 goals)

External links

References

1969 births
Living people
Cameroonian footballers
Cameroon international footballers
Cameroonian expatriate footballers
Rot-Weiss Essen players
SSV Reutlingen 05 players
SpVgg Unterhaching players
2. Bundesliga players
Expatriate footballers in Germany
Association football forwards
Cameroonian expatriate sportspeople in Germany
Footballers from Douala
Regionalliga players